"Are You Happy Now?" is a 2003 song by Michelle Branch

Are You Happy Now or Are You Happy Now? may also refer to:
 Are You Happy Now? (album), a 2008 album by Aya Kamiki
 "Are You Happy Now?", a 2012 episode from season 8 of SpongeBob SquarePants
 a 1962 song by The Four Seasons
 a 1983 song by Poison Girls
 a 1988 song by The Charlottes
 a 1992 song by Richard Shindell
 a 1996 song by Sophia
 a 2001 song by Sahara Hotnights
 a 2002 song by Shannon Lawson
 a 2011 song by Megan and Liz
 a 2011 song by Miss Li
 a 2017 song by Rascal Flatts
 a 2022 album by Jensen McRae

See also
 Are You Happy? (disambiguation)
 Happy Now (disambiguation)